Laha may refer to:
 
 Laha people, an ethnic group in Vietnam 
 Laha language, a Kra language of Vietnam
 Laha language (Indonesia), a language spoken on Ambon Island

Places
 Laha, Seram, Indonesia
 Laha, Heilongjiang, a town in Nehe City, Heilongjiang, China
 Laha airfield near Laha Village, on Ambon Island, Indonesia

Surname
Laha is also an Indian and Austrian surname. People named Laha are
 Radha Laha (1930-1999) Indian scientist
 Prabuddha Laha (1950-2004) Indian politician

See also
Kafr Laha (Arabic: كفرلاها), a town north of Homs, Syria
Lahas, commune in the Gers department, France
Ake Laha or Akelaha, village on Halmahera Island, Indonesia
Entomobrya laha, animal, a member of the order Entognatha